Chris Gehrke (February 21, 1966 – May 7, 1991) was a race driver on the Automobile Racing Club of America (ARCA) circuit.

Career
Chris first began racing in open wheeled cars, winning the 1988 Spokane Grand Prix and finishing third in the SCCA Star Mazda Series. That same year, Chris also ran a couple of ARCA races in rented Bill Venturini Chevrolets. In 1989, Gehrke campaigned for rookie of the year honors in ARCA, finishing a close second, behind Graham Taylor in rookie points, and finishing seventh in the final driver standings. In 1990, Gehrke improved his performance in ARCA, finishing fourth in the season with five top-five finishes and eleven top-ten finishes. His best finish of the season was second at Toledo Speedway. Chris also proved that he could run on the bigger tracks, with fourth-place finishes at Atlanta and Pocono.

Death 
On the 67th lap of the 1991 Poulan Pro 500 at Talladega, Chris Gehrke spun in the tri-oval and flipped several times before sliding to a halt. Several seconds later, the car of Carl Miskotten, Jr. hit Gehrke's car behind the left rear tire at nearly full speed. Gehrke suffered serious head injuries and died three days later.

References
  
 

1966 births
1991 deaths
ARCA Menards Series drivers
American racing drivers
Racing drivers who died while racing
Sports deaths in Alabama
Indy Pro 2000 Championship drivers